In Norse mythology, Ítreksjóð (Old Norse) is a son of Odin and a god. Ítreksjóð is attested in chapter 75 of the Prose Edda book Skáldskaparmál, where he is numbered among the Æsir and listed as one of Odin's sons. Ítreksjóð is sometimes modernly anglicized as Itreksiod or Itreksjod.

Notes

References
 Faulkes, Anthony (Trans.) (1995) [1987]. Edda. Everyman. 

Æsir
Sons of Odin
Norse gods